Gela Papashvili (born 14 April 1969) is a Georgian wrestler. He competed in the men's Greco-Roman 48 kg at the 1996 Summer Olympics.

References

External links
 

1969 births
Living people
Male sport wrestlers from Georgia (country)
Olympic wrestlers of Georgia (country)
Wrestlers at the 1996 Summer Olympics
Sportspeople from Tbilisi